Events in the year 2018 in Switzerland.

Incumbents
President of the Swiss Confederation: Alain Berset
President of the National Council: Dominique de Buman
President of the Swiss Council of States: Karin Keller-Sutter

Events
 23 September – The Canton of St Gallen become the second canton in Switzerland to vote in favor of a ban on facial coverings in public with two-thirds casting a ballot in favor.

Sports
9 to 25 February – Switzerland participated at the 2018 Winter Olympics in PyeongChang, South Korea, with 166 competitors in 14 sports

9 to 18 March – Switzerland participated at the 2018 Winter Paralympics in PyeongChang, South Korea

Deaths

9 January – Kurt Thalmann, footballer (b. 1931)
10 January – Urs Fankhauser, rower (b. 1943).
16 January – Wilhelm Melliger, equestrian (b. 1953)

1 March – Luigi Taveri, motorcycle road racer (b. 1929)

19 March – Jürg Laederach, writer (b. 1945)

24 March – Lys Assia, singer (b. 1924)

4 May – Alexander Tschäppät, politician (b. 1952)

19 May – Ernst Sieber, pastor (b. 1927)

6 July – Gilbert Facchinetti, entrepreneur and football executive, President of Neuchâtel Xamax (b. 1936).

References

 
2010s in Switzerland
Years of the 21st century in Switzerland
Switzerland
Switzerland